The 1916 Birmingham Panthers football team was an American football team that represented Birmingham College (now part of Birmingham–Southern College) as an independent during the 1916 college football season. Under head coach Charles H. Brown, the team compiled a 7–1 record.

Schedule

References

Birmingham
Birmingham–Southern Panthers football seasons
Birmingham Panthers football